The Hugh L. King House is a historic house at 110 West Spring Street in Heber Springs, Arkansas.  It is a -story L-shaped wood-frame house, with an eclectic combination of Queen Anne and Italianate features.  It has a two-story polygonal turreted projection at one corner, and a wraparound porch with delicate turned posts.  Although most of the exterior is finished in weatherboard, portions are finished in decorative cut shingles.  The oldest portion of the house was built about 1882; it achieved its present form and style c. 1893–4 with a major addition.

The house was listed on the National Register of Historic Places in 1992.

See also
National Register of Historic Places listings in Cleburne County, Arkansas

References

Houses on the National Register of Historic Places in Arkansas
Italianate architecture in Arkansas
Queen Anne architecture in Arkansas
Houses completed in 1894
Houses in Cleburne County, Arkansas